The Bedford City School District is a school district located in Cuyahoga County, Ohio, serving the communities of Bedford, Bedford Heights, Oakwood, and Walton Hills. The district educates about 3,000 students from pre-kindergarten to 12th grade.

Schools

High school
Bedford High School

Middle school
Heskett Middle School

Primary and intermediate schools

Central Primary School
Glendale Primary School
Carylwood Intermediate School
Columbus Intermediate School

References

External links

School districts in Cuyahoga County, Ohio